IslamOnline is a global Islamic website on the Internet providing services to Muslims and non-Muslims in several languages. Its motto is "credibility and distinction".It was founded by Yusuf al-Qaradawi.

Contents 
The website consists of forums on various issues, such as Books, new Muslims and entertainment, as well as other interactive venues, such as an "Ask the Scholar" section, where visitors can post questions regarding Islam.
The Arabic and English sections are tailored to appeal to their respective audiences.
In just four years (2000–2003), around 306,691 materials have been published, 233,223 of which are in Arabic while 73,486 are in English.

Staff 
The IslamOnline administrative office is located in Doha, Qatar. Its content is managed by the Al-Balagh Cultural Society.

See also
Islam

References

External links 
 Website in Arabic
 Website in English
 Al-Balagh Cultural Society 

Sunni Islamic websites
Islamic political websites
Muslim Brotherhood
Internet properties established in 1997
Qatari websites